The Giro di Castelbuono (officially Giro Podistico Internazionale Castelbuono) is an annual road running competition over 10 kilometres which takes place in Castelbuono, on the island of Sicily, Italy. First held in 1912, the competition, which holds IAAF Gold Label Road Race status, is one of the oldest road races in Europe, which is the inspiration for the event's nickname – "La Corsa Più Antica" (The Oldest Race). The race, typically held on (or around) July 26 to coincide with Saint Anne's Day, has been held almost every year since its inauguration, although the two World Wars interrupted the event over those periods. The race has been broadcast every year for a decade by Italian television channel Rai Sport Più.

From 2011 onwards, the race departed from its long-standing original distance of 11.3 kilometres and switched to a certified 10 km circuit. From 1912 to 2010, the course of the race followed a looped pattern of ten laps of roughly 1.13 km around the historical centre of the town. The start and end point of the race was at Piazza Margherita. Beginning at the square, the route went south along Via Roma and into Via Mario Levante. It then went east along Via Camillo Benso Conte Di Cavour before heading back north along Via Vittorio Emanuele II. The course then followed Via Umberto I in a north-westerly direction which arrives back at the starting point. The race is a challenging one for athletes as they must contend with a difficult uphill section on each lap.

Over the history of the event, the Giro di Castelbuono has attracted many of the sport's top athletes. Among the past winners are former world record holders Khalid Khannouchi and Paul Tergat, three-time London Marathon winner Martin Lel, and four-time road running World Champion Zersenay Tadese. The pre-international era of the race also featured prominent runners, including Gelindo Bordin, Orlando Pizzolato, Venanzio Ortis, Franco Fava, as well as Sicily's own Luigi Zarcone. While the competition has principally been a men's race throughout its existence, a women's race was featured on the programme from 1995 to 2004. Winners of this short-lived race included Rome Marathon winner Gloria Marconi, Florence Marathon winner Florence Barsosio and multiple Major Marathon champion Margaret Okayo.

Past winners

National era

International era

The course distances are 11.3 km for men and 5.6 km for women, unless stated otherwise
Key:

See also
BOclassic
Memorial Peppe Greco

References

List of winners
Monti, Dave & Civai, Franco (2010-07-27). La Corsa Piu' Antica 11.2 km (M) and 5.6 km (F). Association of Road Racing Statisticians. Retrieved on 2010-08-08.
Albo d'oro . Giro di Castelbuono. Retrieved on 2010-08-08.

Further reading
Lirio Abbate & Rosario Mazzola, La storia del giro podistico internazionale di Castelbuono, Promos Editore (1994).

External links
Official website
Winners of the Trofeo Sant'Agata road race in Catania

10K runs
Athletics competitions in Italy
Recurring events established in 1912
Sport in Sicily
1912 establishments in Italy
Summer events in Italy